The 1988–89 Superliga Espanola de Hockey Hielo season was the 15th season of the Superliga Espanola de Hockey Hielo, the top level of ice hockey in Spain. Six teams participated in the league, and CG Puigcerda won the championship. The league had not been contested since 1985-86, with only junior competitions being held in those years.

Standings

External links
Season on hockeyarchives.info

Spain
Liga Nacional de Hockey Hielo seasons
Liga